The Nottingham Guardian was a newspaper in Nottingham, Nottinghamshire, England that ran from 10 October 1905 to 5 September 1953. It was a continuation of the Nottingham Daily Guardian  which had run from 1861 to 1905. In 1953 it merged with the Nottingham Journal to form the Nottingham Guardian Journal.

References 

Publications established in 1905
Publications disestablished in 1953
Newspapers published in Nottinghamshire
Defunct newspapers published in the United Kingdom
1905 establishments in England